Rockledge  is the oldest city in Brevard County, Florida. The city's population was 24,926 at the 2010 United States Census, and is part of the Palm Bay−Melbourne−Titusville Metropolitan Statistical Area.

History

Rockledge was officially founded on August 7, 1887, making it the oldest incorporated municipality in Brevard County. The name Rockledge, attributed to Gardner S. Hardee, an early settler, comes from the many ledges of coquina rock that line the Indian River. Other sources refer to a man named Cephas Bailey Magruder, who built his home after settling in the area in 1876 near the Indian River. Magruder called his home "the rockledge home" and the name was eventually attributed to the whole town. It was originally referred to as Rock Ledge; the two-word name persisted through the 19th century.
Early industry in the area was based on the citrus trade and accommodation for tourists traveling to South Florida via the Atlantic Intracoastal Waterway of the Indian River.

President Grover Cleveland and his wife visited the city in 1888.

The town had several large hotels in the late 19th century to the early 20th century that catered to Northern tourists escaping cold winters. These included the Hotel Indian River, the Plaza, and the Rockledge Hotel, all located north of Barton Avenue, looking out over the river.

Towards the early part of the 20th century, Rockledge was known as a resort town. In the winter months, the population would rise from 200 to almost 2,000 people. Up until about 1911, access to Rockledge was via boat and rail. Steamboats in the Indian River connected with Henry Flagler's trains to bring people to the North. Small boats, sailboats, and small launches frequently stopped to unload freight and passengers. Most of the tourists in this time were wealthy and would use the boats to connect to the rail system at that time. After World War I, the automobile allowed the average person to travel to the area and their encampments dotted the area. The Dixie Highway was completed in 1915 and spanned most of Florida. In the 1920s, US1 was paved and replaced the Dixie Highway.

In 1939–1940, a winter visitor donated the money to construct a hospital. The mayor convinced the council to donate land from the former golf course that had belonged to the defunct Indian River Hotel for the hospital.

Rockledge underwent an expansion further west and south in the 1960s when it became a bedroom community for the nearby Kennedy Space Center. Several hundred families from all over the United States settled in the city with the advent of the Apollo missions and the space shuttle program.

Barton Boulevard replaced US 1 as the town's economic center as new subdivisions spread south along Fiske Boulevard. By the 1970s, the bulk of Rockledge's population lived between US 1 and I-95.

Developments stretched north to south from the late 1950s to the 1990s. Virginia Park, Marlin Manor, Fairway Estates, Rockledge Country Club Estates, Golfview Estates, Kings Grant, Georgetown, Levitt Park and Woodsmere had all been established by the 1960s–1980s

Levitt Park and Woodsmere were built atop a gladiola farm and an orange grove. The huge Australian Pine trees at the southernmost points of Fiske Boulevard are all that remain of the grove's windbreaks. The subdivision of Silver Pines, while part of unincorporated Brevard County outside the city limit, was also built during this period and is identified by citizens as a part of the city.

Geography

It is bounded on the north by Cocoa, on the west by the St. Johns River and scrubland, to the south by Viera (unincorporated) and Melbourne, and to the east by the Indian River Lagoon and Merritt Island (unincorporated) on the opposite shore.

Climate
Rockledge has a humid subtropical climate, Köppen climate classification Cfa. The area's warm and humid climate is caused primarily by its proximity to the Gulf Stream, which flows off the east coast of Florida. There are two major seasons which characterize the area. One is hot and rainy, lasting from June until late September. The other is the dry season, October through May, brings more moderate temperatures and less frequent rainfall.

Environment
Rainfall can run off from the city into the Indian River Lagoon, with resultant pollution. As a result, the city has banned fertilizing from June 1 to September 30 annually.

Demographics

As of the census of 2000, there were 20,170 people, 7,864 households, and 5,677 families residing in the city. The racial makeup of the city was 81.06% White, 14.64% African American, 0.28% Native American, 1.66% Asian, 0.08% Pacific Islander, 0.73% from other races, and 1.56% from two or more races. Hispanic or Latino of any race were 3.28% of the population.

There were 7,864 households, out of which 31.0% had children living with them, 56.8% were married couples living together, 11.9% had a female householder with no husband present, and 27.8% were non-families. 22.5% of all households were made up of individuals, and 9.5% had someone living alone who was 65 years of age or older. The average household size was 2.51 and the average family size was 2.93.

Per the 2000 Census, the population was distributed as follows:

 23.8% under the age of 18
 6.0% from 18 to 24
 28.6% from 25 to 44
 25.2% from 45 to 64
 16.4% who were 65 years of age or older.

The median age was 40 years. For every 100 females, there were 90.6 males. For every 100 females age 18 and over, there were 87.3 males.

In 2010, the city had the lowest percentage of people living in poverty of any municipality measured in the county, 5%, compared to an average of 10% countywide.

Museums and other points of interest
H. S. Williams House
Rockledge Drive Residential District
Marion S. Whaley Citrus Packing House
Persimmon Mound
Barton Avenue Residential District
Valencia Subdivision Residential District

Parks and recreation
Rockledge has the following parks:

 Anderson Stormwater Park
 Barton Park [under construction]
 Columbia Park
 Dick Blake Park
 Cruickshank Sanctuary
 Golfview Park
 Holland Park
 McClarty Park
 Memorial Walk at Levitt Park
 Morris Park
 Raider Park
 River Groves Dock
 Riverwalk - A Family Park
 Rockledge Park
 Silver Pines Park
 Taylor Park
 Valencia Dock

Government

The City of Rockledge functions under a Council-Manager government. The Mayor and City Council members are elected to three-year terms. There are six City Council members whose terms are staggered to allow election of two council seats each year. The city holds municipal elections on the first Tuesday after the first Monday of November each year.

While the Mayor and the City Council act as the legislative body of the City of Rockledge, the actual operation of the city and its functions lies with the city manager and his departmental support staff consisting of assistant city manager/finance director, city clerk/public relations officer, building official, fire chief, chief of police, director of public works and director of wastewater treatment and water reclamation.

The chairman of the City Council appoints members of the City Council to serve on subcommittees and to represent the City Council on other governmental bodies that require the city's input.

In 2013, there were 237 city employees.

Finances

In 2007, the city had a taxable real estate base of $1.55 billion.

In 2009–2010, the city paid $2.2 million for solid waste disposal. This was furnished at a cost of $168.48 annually per residence. Non residential (business) collection cost $632.89 each, annually.

Police

Rockledge has approximately fifty full-time certified police officers serving the city. In addition, there are 18 support staff positions, five reserve officers, eight crossing guards, and seven civilian volunteers. All police officers must be certified by the State of Florida. In August 2011, the new $4 million police headquarters was finished and it is located at 1776 Jack Oates Blvd. The old police station on Barton Blvd may be home to a future library and other non-profit organizations, who will lease the former police headquarters from the city.

Fire protection

Along with one other city in the county, Rockledge has its own fire department with three stations. There is a county fire department within the city limits.

Boards and committees

The City of Rockledge contains several citizen-run boards and committees that make recommendations to the city on various issues. The positions held on the boards and committees are on a voluntary basis and non-paid. The boards and committees of Rockledge are:

 Board of Adjustment
 Board of Adjustment and Appeals
 Business Development Committee
 Citizens Advisory Committee
 Citizens Recreation Advisory Board
 Code Enforcement Board
 Community Redevelopment Agency Board of Commissioners
 Education Advisory Committee
 Planning Commission
 Retirement Board, Fire Employees
 Retirement Board, General Employees
 Retirement Board, Police Employees
 The Rockledge Environmental Enhancement Board

The city publishes an official newsletter for residents of Rockledge.

Mayors

Fiske 1929–1933
Geiger 1940–1952
J.W. Wilkins 1957–1958
Curt Barnes 1959–1962
J.W. Wilkins 1963–1964
Grady 1965–1974
Jack Oates 1975–1998
Larry L. Schultz 1999–2010
Thomas J. Price 2011–current

Economy
Local businesses focus on technology and aerospace, especially those related to nearby Kennedy Space Center and Cape Canaveral.

Citrus grove production is nominal, producing citrus confections, juice and souvenirs for the tourist trade and for local consumption.

Personal income
The median income for a household in the city was $45,218, and the median income for a family was $52,332. Males had a median income of $39,434 versus $25,918 for females. The per capita income for the city was $20,700. About 4.0% of families and 6.5% of the population were below the poverty line, including 6.2% of those under age 18 and 7.2% of those age 65 or over.

Industry
The leading industries in Rockledge are Educational, health and social services, 20%; Manufacturing, 12%; and Professional, scientific, management, administrative, and waste management services, 11%.

Rivian Automotive, a tiny start-up, plans to begin production of cars in 2013.

Tourism
Rockledge has the following annual community events, festivals, and parades:

 Art/Craft Fair
 Cruise-On-In Car Show
 Independence Day Family Picnic
 Light Up Rockledge and Holiday Parade
 Memorial Day Parade
 National Night Out
 Taylor Park Fall Family Festival

Workforce
In 2007, the average size of Rockledge's labor force was 11,886. Of that group, 11,455 were employed and 431 were unemployed, for an unemployment rate of 3.6%.

Among the most common occupations in Rockledge are Management, professional, and related occupations, 36%. Sales and office occupations, 28%. and Service occupations, 15%. Approximately 72 percent of workers in Rockledge, Florida work for companies, 19 percent work for the government and 6 percent are self-employed.

Housing
Reflecting economic times, in 2008, 45 building permits were issued for 105 units. In 2007, 131 permits were issued for 158 units. Also, in 2006, an estimated 106 permits for 341 units were issued.

The median home price in 2007 was $214,965.

In February 2011, the average price of homes actually sold was $131,500.

Education

The public schools in Rockledge are operated by the Brevard County Public School Board. Local schools include Hans Christian Andersen Elementary; Golfview Elementary; John F. Kennedy Middle School; Ronald McNair Magnet Middle School; and Rockledge High School.

Private schools include St. Mary's Catholic School, Rockledge Christian School, Trinity Lutheran School, and Rockledge Montessori School. Sawgrass Academy Middle was a former charter school in the town.

Infrastructure

Transportation

Major roads
Rockledge is served by U.S. Route 1. Major east–west roads are oriented towards this north–south road.

The following are at least four-lane roads, unless otherwise designated.

National roads
  U.S. 1. – This road was constructed east of the railroad throughout the city. In 2010, it was widened to six lanes throughout Rockledge. A landscaped median was installed. This section of the road carries approximately 45,000 vehicles daily. Major intersections include CR 502 and Barton Boulevard.
  Interstate 95 – A very small portion runs through the city at Exit 195.

State roads
  SR 519 (Fiske Blvd) is a state road which at the southernmost point connects to Stadium Parkway in Viera and at the northernmost point to SR 520 in Cocoa. SR 519 is a four-lane road.  Major intersections include CR 502, Interstate 95, and Barton Boulevard.

County roads
  CR 502 (Barnes Blvd) links US 1, Murrell Road, SR 519 and I-95. CR 502 is a two-lane road except for the easternmost portion which has four lanes that eventually merge into two. Major intersections include Interstate 95, SR 519, and U.S. 1.
  CR 515 (Rockledge Drive) winds along the Indian River edge and is a portion of the Indian River Lagoon Scenic Highway. Along the road are century-old oaks and homes in late 18th century style. There are no major intersections.

Bus
 Space Coast Area Transit operates a public bus service in Rockledge and vicinity.

Rail
 The Florida East Coast Railway runs through Rockledge but does not stop. Historically, there was a stop on the Florida East Coast Railway, but it was abandoned when passenger service became unprofitable.

Air
 The city has a private runway at the Rockledge Airpark that used to be run by Aero Adventures Inc, but was closed over safety concerns in 2015. The paved runway is approximately 2000 feet with a parallel grass runway on the east side of the property, and a local mechanic operates from the former hangars.

Notable people

 Lyman Barnes, Wisconsin politician, practiced law in Rockledge for five years
 Kurt Debus, former director of NASA's Launch Operations Center
 Lucas "Tiger" Fafara, II, child actor, played Tooey Brown in Leave it to Beaver (1957–1963)
 Tammy Lynn Leppert, actress  
 Troy Matteson, PGA Tour and 2002 NCAA champion golfer
 DeLane Matthews, actress, played Beth Barry on Dave's World (1993–1997)
 Mel Mitchell, professional football player
 Laurent Robinson, professional football player
 Scott Thompson, comedian, also known as Carrot Top, was born in Rockledge
 Beau Taylor, MLB player, #46 catcher for the Cleveland Indians. Former catcher of the Oakland Athletics
 Melissa Witek, Miss Florida USA 2005, contestant on NBC's Treasure Hunters

References

External links

www.cityofrockledge.org
City-Data.com Comprehensive Statistical Data and more about Rockledge
Local Newspaper- Town Rockledge

Cities in Brevard County, Florida
Populated places established in 1887
Cities in Florida
Populated places on the Intracoastal Waterway in Florida
1887 establishments in Florida